Milana Safronova (born 28 April 1991) is a Kazakhstani boxer.

She won a medal at the 2019 AIBA Women's World Boxing Championships.

References

1991 births
Living people
People from Karaganda Region
Kazakhstani women boxers
AIBA Women's World Boxing Championships medalists
Light-welterweight boxers
21st-century Kazakhstani women